Gun Town is a 1946 American Western film directed by Wallace Fox and starring Kirby Grant, Claire Carleton and Lyle Talbot.

Cast
 Kirby Grant as Kip Lewis 
 Fuzzy Knight as Ivory 
 Lyle Talbot as Lucky Dorgan 
 Claire Carleton as Belle Townley 
 Louise Currie as Buckskin Jane Sawyer 
 Gene Garrick as Davie Sawyer 
 Earle Hodgins as Sheriff 
 Ray Bennett as Nevada - Henchman 
 Dan White as Joe - Henchman

References

Bibliography
 Blottner, Gene. Universal Sound Westerns, 1929-1946: The Complete Filmography. McFarland & Company, 2003.

External links
 

1946 films
1946 Western (genre) films
American Western (genre) films
American black-and-white films
Films directed by Wallace Fox
Universal Pictures films
1940s English-language films
1940s American films